Evelyn Akhator (born 3 February 1995) is a Nigerian professional women's basketball forward/center for Flammes Carolo. She was drafted by the Dallas Wings of the Women's National Basketball Association (WNBA) as the 3rd overall pick in the 2017 WNBA Draft.

Kentucky statistics
Source

WNBA career
Evelyn was drafted as the 3rd overall pick in the 2017 WNBA draft by the Dallas Wings. She played 15 games in her rookie season for the Dallas side where she averaged 0.9 points per game, 0.2 blocks per game, 0.1 steal per game. She was waived by the Dallas Wings on 13 May 2018.

On 13 February 2019, Akhator returned to the WNBA by signing for the Chicago Sky on a training camp deal.

International career
Evelyn Represents the Nigerian national basketball team. She made her first appearance for the team during the 2017 FIBA Afrobasket tournament in Mali. Evelyn averaged 15.3 points and 9.5 rebounds per game during the tournament and also made the top 5 players list. Evelyn was part of the Nigerian national basketball team at the 2018 FIBA Women's Basketball World Cup where she averaged 12.6 points,9 rebounds and 1.4 assists during the tournament.

Overseas career
Akhator signed with the Russian side WBC Dynamo Novosibirsk in 2017. She averaged 12.4 points and 8.5 rebounds per game.

On 22 August 2018, Akhator signed with the Turkish Besiktas basketball team. She averaged 15 points and 11 rebounds per game in the Turkish league, and she averaged 15 points and 11 rebounds in the Eurocup tournament, having played more than 30 minutes per game in both competitions.

Ahkator signed with the Spanish side CB Avenida on 15 May 2019.

In November, 2019, Ahkator signed with the French side Flammes Carolo basketball team.

Awards and recognition
In the 2018 Nigerian Sports Awards, Akhator won the Best Sportwoman award and the Basketball player award.

Personal life
Akhator is from a family of three. her parents and her older sibling reside in Nigeria. Her mother Benedicta died in a road accident.

References

External links
Kentucky Wildcats bio

1995 births
Beşiktaş women's basketball players
Centers (basketball)
Chipola Indians women's basketball players
Dallas Wings draft picks
Dallas Wings players
Kentucky Wildcats women's basketball players
Living people
Nigerian expatriate basketball people in Russia
Nigerian expatriate basketball people in Turkey
Nigerian expatriate basketball people in the United States
Nigerian women's basketball players
Power forwards (basketball)
Sportspeople from Lagos